Hang West was a Wapentake (Hundred) in the North Riding of Yorkshire.

It was bordered on its eastern side by  Hang East, the West Riding of Yorkshire on the southern side with Westmorland and the West Riding on the Western side.

Etymology
The name of Hang West name derives from the meeting place of the Wapentake, which was situated at Hang Bank, halfway between Hutton Hang and the village of Finghall. The name of the wapentake is first attested in 1157 as Hangeschire. Hang is believed to derive from the Old English word hængra ('wooded slope').

Settlements
The table below lists the settlements within the Hang West Wapentake. These are as listed in Bulmer's North Riding.

Notes

References

Wapentakes of the North Riding of Yorkshire